Carlos Valencia may refer to:

 Carlos Valencia (footballer, born 1989), Colombian footballer
 Carlos Valencia (footballer, born 1953), Colombian footballer